Riverview is a suburb on the Lower North Shore of Sydney of Sydney, in the state of New South Wales, Australia. Riverview is located 9 kilometres north-west of the Sydney central business district, in the local government area of the Municipality of Lane Cove. It is situated on the northern side of the Lane Cove River, at the head of Tambourine Bay; the foreshore is occupied by Tambourine Bay Park. Riverview is primarily a residential area.

History
Riverview takes its name from its location, which provides a 'view' of the Lane Cove 'River'.<ref>The Book of Sydney Suburbs, Compiled by Frances Poll0n, Angus & Robertson Publishers, 1990, Published in Australia , page</ref> St Ignatius' College was built in 1880.

A detailed history of Riverview will be found in Ball, John and Pam, A history of Riverview: the suburb'', 2013, Oughtershaw Press, 499 pages, 41 pages of illustrations.

Tambourine Bay was named for the woman Tambourine Nell or Tambourine Sal, who lived in a cave on the foreshore whilst hiding from police.

Population
In the 2016 Census, there were 3,354 people in Riverview. 75.2% of people were born in Australia. The next most common country of birth was England at 5.0%. 85.5% of people only spoke English at home. The most common responses for religion were Catholic 46.4%, No Religion 22.0% and Anglican 13.1%.

Schools
Riverview is home to the Jesuit school, St Ignatius' College, Riverview. Located in Tambourine Bay Road, it was designed by J. Dennehy and built in 1880. A three-storey sandstone building, it was designed in a Victorian Classical style, departing from the convention whereby educational buildings were normally designed in a Gothic style. Extensions were carried out in 1887, 1906 and in the 1920s. The grounds include an observatory and wharf shelter. The school is listed on the Register of the National Estate.

Church
 St Ignatius' College Chapel

Parks and recreation

There are several recreation areas throughout Riverview. Marjorie York Reserve, named after a longtime local resident, is a playground by the local shops and is very popular with families. Tambourine Bay Reserve is a large park situated at the end of Tambourine Bay Road, as well as Kallaroo Rd, and contains barbecue and picnic facilities, as well as a playground. It also offers splendid views over Tambourine Bay Road and is a hub for bushwalks to Longueville and around the bay. Burns Bay Reserve lies in West Riverview and is used for children's soccer matches in the cooler months of the year. Like Tambourine Bay Reserve, it is complete with picnic and barbecue facilities, and also a playground. There is also a small recreation area at the end of the walkway leading from Flaumont Avenue, complete with benches and a swing set.

Heritage listing
 Burns Bay Sewerage Aqueduct

Transport
Busways operates routes 253 to the Sydney central business district and 254 to McMahons Point ferry wharf. Tambourine Bay Road is the main thoroughfare through the area, and leads from Lane Cove's shopping district. River Road West runs along Riverview's northern border, and connects to Lane Cove West and Gladesville to the west and Longueville, North Sydney and the Sydney central business district to the east.

Climate

References

External links
 

Suburbs of Sydney
Lane Cove Council
Lane Cove River